The Liberian Entertainment Awards (commonly referred to as The LEA or simply LEA) is an annual awards show, recognizing Liberians at home and in the diaspora for their outstanding contributions to the Liberian entertainment industry. The annual ceremony, held in the United States, features performances by established and promising artists. The LEA was founded in 2009 by Tarkus Zonen. The inaugural ceremony was held on January 31, 2009, at the Central Piedmont Community College in Charlotte, North Carolina.

Locations

Categories

Best Artist
Best New Artist
Best Gospel Artist
Best Actor
Best Actress
Best Filmmaker
Best Author
Best Online Radio Personality

Community Crusader
Best Hipco Artist
Best Music Video
Best Film
Best Fashion Designer
Song of the Year
Best Model
Best DJ

Award ceremonies

2009
The first annual Liberian Entertainment Awards was held on January 31, 2009, at the Central Piedmont Community College in Charlotte, North Carolina. The ceremony featured performances from Lucky Shango, FA, Black Diamond, C-Needles and Atlanta Dance Crew. Sundaygar Dearboy won Song of the Year for "Bayjay". The music video for 2C's "Liberia Girl" won the Best Music Video plaque. Gerald Barclay won the Best Filmmaker award, while Alexander Sonpon won the Best Event Promoter award. Francis Doe won the Best Athlete award. The movie Imported Bride won the Best Movie category. Furthermore, FA Deline walked away with the Best Artist award.

2010
The second annual LEA was held on January 30, 2010, at the McGlohon Theatre in Charlotte, North Carolina. Elma Shaw won Best Author for her critically acclaimed book Redemption Road. Liberian-American singer Chris Deshield won the Best Artist award. 2C won the Artist of the Year award.

2011
The third annual Liberian Entertainment Awards was held on January 29, 2011, at the Center Stage Theater in Atlanta, Georgia. Jodi took home three awards, including Song of the Year for "Love You". Takun J was nominated twice but didn't win any award. Liberian-based artist Luckay Buckay won the Hipco Artist award. Glorious Lamp International won the Best Gospel Artist award. Benji Cavalli and the Boucantier Royales won the Best Dance Group category. Momo "DJ Mo Mass" Massaquoi won the Best DJ award, surpassing David "DJ Spek Takula" Fromayan. The late Wilton G. S. Sankawulo won the Best Author award. Sekou Jabateh Oliseh won the Best Athlete award, eclipsing former Tennessee Titans linebacker Rennie Curran and three others. The Best Filmmaker category was awarded to Seywon Weah, and the Best Movie category was awarded to Mr Wee Wee.

2012
The fourth annual LEA was held on January 28, 2012, at the Ferst Center for the Arts in Atlanta, Georgia. It was hosted by Natty Skolo and Pam Manneh. The ceremony featured performances from Zaye Tete, Charlotte Wonjah, G-Rize, Infamous TK, Ivan P, BabyEye Taylor, Tru Storry, Nyna Touch, Moses Swaray, George-B and Tomah Tokay. David Mell was the biggest awardee of the night, winning the awards for Best Artist and Best Hipco Artist. Steve Kelly won the Best Gospel Artist award. Killing Me Softly won the Best Movie award, and Prinze Whyee won the Best Filmmaker award. The music video for G-Rize's "I Love My Girl" won the Best Music Video award. Junior Freeman and African Soldier's "Da My Area" won the Song of the Year award. The Best Music Producer category was awarded to Cypha D'King, and the Best DJ award went to DJ 2Risky. Heinz Johnson won the Best Radio Personality award, while Catherine Woyee-Jones won the Community Crusader award. Patricia Jabbeh Wesley, an associate professor of English at Penn State Altoona, won the Best Author award.

2013
The fifth annual Liberian Entertainment Awards was held at the Cultural Arts Center of Montgomery College, Maryland. The 2013 ceremony was hosted by Heinz Johnson and Diamond Sonpon. Takun J was nominated for the Best Hipco Artist award. Somewhere in Baltimore won the Best Film award.

2014
The sixth annual LEA was held on February 22, 2014, at the Cultural Arts Center in Silver Spring, Maryland. It was hosted by Alex Sonpon and Nadia Kehzie. Several Liberian-based artists were nominated, including Takun J, F.A, Sweetz, DSP, Luckay Buckay and Bernice Blackie. Takun J won the Best Hipco Artist award and received a nomination in the Best Artist category. DSP received two nominations, including Best Music Video for "Promise". Beatrice Mulbah took home the Best Actress award, while Montel Swaray won the Best Actor award. The Best New Artist category went to Musulyn Sweetz Myers, and the award for Best Artist was awarded to Munnah. Boys Cry won the Best Film award, and Tibelrosa Tarponweh won the Best Filmmaker award. Xpolay's "Pot Not Balling" (Remix) won the Song of the Year award. Liberian-based Gospel singer Kanvee Gaines Adams won the Best Gospel Artist award. The music video for Queen V's "Jue You Bad" won the Best Music Video award.

2015
The seventh annual Liberian Entertainment Awards took place on February 21, 2015, at Howard University's Cramton Auditorium. The ceremony featured performances from Chris Deshield, 2C, Togar Howard, Bernice Blackie and David Mell, among others.

Winners and nominees

See also
Music of Liberia

References

International music awards
Awards established in 2009
2009 establishments in the United States
African music awards